JSK Film Corporation is an Indian film production and distribution company based in Chennai. JSK film corporation along with film productions acquires negative rights of film's too. JSK Audio label was launched in 2014 which are into the production of music for the subsequent films which are being produced by JSK Film Corporation.

History 

JSK Film Corporation founded by J. Satish Kumar at its early years entered the distribution of film's all around Tamil Nadu in 2006. They have distributed Hollywood film's Rush Hour 3, The Forbidden Kingdom, Live Free or Die Hard and Rambo in Tamil Nadu. JSK Film Corporation has acquired the negative rights of nine film's starting from 2007.

Filmography

Distribution

Production

Film soundtracks released

Awards and nominations[edit]

References 

Indian companies established in 2006
Film production companies based in Chennai
Mass media companies established in 2006
2006 establishments in Tamil Nadu